The Show Must Go On is a 1996 album by Shirley Bassey. It spent 11 weeks on the UK albums chart, peaking at No. 47.  The album was awarded a silver disc.  The album was produced by Mike Smith.

Track listing
 "Slave to the Rhythm" (Bruce Woolley, Simon Darlow, Stephen Lipson, Trevor Horn)
 "You'll See" (Madonna, David Foster)
 "Every Breath You Take" (Sting)
 "Can I Touch You There" (Michael Bolton)
 "I'll Stand By You" (Chrissie Hynde, Tom Kelly, Billy Steinberg)
 "When I Need You" (Albert Hammond, Carole Bayer Sager)
 "All Woman" (Don Devaney, Andy Morris, Lisa Stansfield)
 "He Kills Everything" (Peter Bischof-Fallenstein)
 "Where Is the Love" (Ralph MacDonald, William Salter)
 "We've Got Tonight" (Bob Seger)
 "One Day I'll Fly Away" (Joe Sample, Will Jennings)
 "Hello" (Lionel Richie)
 "Baby Come To Me" (Rod Temperton)
 "Show Must Go On" (Queen)

References

External links
 The Show Must Go On (Allmusic.com)
 The Show Must Go On (Discogs.com)

Covers albums
Shirley Bassey albums
1996 albums